EuroCyclingTrips–CMI Pro Cycling is a UCI Continental cycling team based in the United States territory of Guam.

Overview
The team is based in Guam but is part of Equipe CMI, which has cycling and triathlon clubs in the United States and France.

It is closely tied to EuroCyclingTrips, which offers cycling tours in Europe guided by current and former professionals such as Siméon Green and David McKenzie. The sports director is Dirk Van Hove of Belgium.

Team roster

References

External links

2021 Information Pack

UCI Continental Teams (Oceania)